Pella limbata is a species of beetle belonging to the family Staphylinidae native to Europe.

References

Staphylinidae
Beetles described in 1789